Islam in Hawaii organised its first official body in 1979, with the incorporation of the Muslim Students' Association of Hawaii, though the organisation had been operational as early as 1968.  The group initially prayed in a cottage, before purchasing the Manoa Mosque in the 1979–1980 period. However, a 1992 study by the American Muslim Support group listed zero mosques in Hawaii in 1992.

As of early 2001, the Manoa Mosque was mentioned as having a Friday Prayer attendance of 200 men, the end of Ramadan iftar meal as having 700 attendees, and the mosque itself as having 2,000 members.

Population 
According to a 2017 estimate, there are around 5,000 Muslims living in Hawaii. This correspond to 0.34% out of population of 1,455,271. Hawaiian Muslims are racially diverse, consisting of American-born converts and those with familial ties to many regions of the world like Asia and the Middle East. The first Muslims appeared in Hawaii as far back as the 19th century.

Islam Day observance
In May 2009, Hawaiian legislators voted to create a state-designated day of recognition, Islam Day on 24 September of that year, in order to recognize "the rich religious, scientific, cultural and artistic contributions of the Islamic world." The resolution was approved in the State Senate by a 22–3 vote.

Islamic art
The Shangri La mansion built by Doris Duke in 1937 serves as the repository for over 2,500 pieces of Islamic art, as well as the Islamic architecture embodied in the building itself. The building is now operated by the Doris Duke Foundation for Islamic Art, with tours in cooperation with the Honolulu Museum of Art.

Education
The Philosophy Departments of the University of Hawaii at Manoa, where the state's main mosque is located, offers an Undergraduate Certificate in Islamic Studies.

References

Further reading

External links
Muslim Association of Hawaii
The Muslim Association of Hawaii

 
Hawaii